is a Prefectural Natural Park in the south of Kyōto Prefecture, Japan. Established in 1964, the park is within the municipality of Kasagi. , associated with Emperor Go-Daigo and events chronicled in the Taiheiki, is a designated Historic Site and Place of Scenic Beauty.

See also
 National Parks of Japan
 Kasagi Station

References

Parks and gardens in Kyoto Prefecture
Protected areas established in 1964
1964 establishments in Japan